Austromyrtus glabra is a species of plant in the Myrtaceae family that is native to south-east Queensland. It can be found growing in eucalypt forests and on rocky soils.

References

glabra
Flora of Queensland